Christian Songs is a record chart compiled and published by Billboard that measures the top-performing contemporary Christian music songs in the United States. The data was compiled by Nielsen Broadcast Data Systems based on the weekly audience impressions of each song played on contemporary Christian radio stations until the end of November 2013. With the Billboard issue dated December 7, 2013, the Christian Songs chart began utilizing the same methodology used for the Hot 100 chart to compile its rankings by measuring the airplay of Christian songs across all radio formats, while incorporating data from digital sales and streaming activity. Christian Airplay, which began being published in 2013, is based solely on Christian radio airplay, a methodology that had previously been used from 2003 to 2013 for Hot Christian Songs.

Number-one songs

Hot Christian Songs

References

2020s
United States Christian Songs